This is a list of the monarchs of Burma (Myanmar), covering the monarchs of all the major kingdoms that existed in the present day Burma (Myanmar). Although Burmese chronicle tradition maintains that various monarchies of Burma (Mon, Burman, Arakanese), began in the 9th century BCE, historically verified data date back only to 1044 CE at the accession of Anawrahta of Pagan. The farther away the data are from 1044, the less verifiable they are. For example, the founding of the city of Pagan (Bagan) in the 9th century is verifiable–although the accuracy of the actual date, given in the Chronicles as 849, remains in question–but the founding of early Pagan dynasty, given as the 2nd century, is not. For early kingdoms, see List of early and legendary monarchs of Burma.

The reign dates follow the latest available dates as discussed in each section.

Early kingdoms
 See List of early and legendary monarchs of Burma.

Pagan (849–1297)

Early Pagan (to 1044)
Below is a partial list of early Pagan kings as reported by the four major chronicles. Prior to Anawrahta, inscriptional evidence exists thus far only for Nyaung-u Sawrahan and Kunhsaw Kyaunghpyu. The list starts from Pyinbya, the fortifier of Pagan (Bagan) according to Hmannan. The Zatadawbon Yazawin is considered the most accurate chronicle for the Pagan period.

Pagan Empire
The list generally follows the chronicle reported order and reign dates. G.H. Luce does not recognize Naratheinkha, and proposes an interregnum of nine years between 1165 and 1174. But Luce's gap has been rigorously questioned. Moreover, Luce proposes that Naratheinga Uzana was king between 1231 and 1235 but it too is not universally accepted.

Lesser kingdoms

Myinsaing (1297–1313)
All main chronicles prior to Hmannan Yazawin say that the co-regency ended in 674 ME (1312/13) but Hmannan says it ended in 672 ME (1310/11). Inscriptional evidence shows that the first brother died on 13 April 1310 but the second brother was still alive.

Pinya (1313–1364)
Most of the dates below are by Than Tun and Gordon Luce who had checked the chronicle reported dates with inscriptions. Myinsaing Sithu does not appear in any of the chronicles.

Sagaing (1315–1364)

Ava (1364–1555)
Different Burmese chronicles give similar but not identical dates for the regnal dates of the Ava period. The following table largely follows the dates given in Hmannan Yazawin and the table of regnal dates given in (Maha Yazawin Vol. 2 2006: 352–355). The regnal dates by G.E. Harvey (Harvey 1925: 366) for the most part are off by a year (a year later) than chronicle and inscriptionally-verified dates.

Hanthawaddy (1287–1539, 1550–1552)

Mrauk-U (1429–1785)

The reign dates are per the Arakanese chronicle Rakhine Razawin Thit (Sandamala Linkara Vol. 2 1931), converted into Western dates using (Eade 1989). The converted dates after 1582 are on the Gregorian calendar. (Some Arakanese chronicles state the foundation of the kingdom a year later, 1430. Moreover, the end of the kingdom is given per Burmese records, 2 January 1785. Arakanese records give a day earlier, 1 January 1785.)

Prome (1482–1542)
See List of rulers of Prome for governors of Prome between the late Pagan and early Restored Toungoo periods.

Toungoo (1510–1752)See List of rulers of Toungoo for the viceroys and governors of Toungoo between 1279 and 1612.The following are based on the reign dates in the Burmese calendar given in Maha Yazawin and Hmannan Yazawin chronicles. (The converted dates after 1582 are on the Gregorian calendar. Some books, e.g., Than Tun's Royal Orders of Burma'' (1983–1990), use old-style Julian dates for the entire Toungoo period.)

Restored Hanthawaddy (1740–1757)

Konbaung (1752–1885)

Pretenders to the Burmese throne since 1885

Konbaung dynasty
King Thibaw (1885–1916)
Princess Myat Phaya Lat (1916–1956)
Prince Taw Phaya (1956–2019) (son-in-law of Myat Phaya Lat)
Richard Taw Phaya Myat Gyi (2019–present) (eldest son of Prince Taw Phaya)

Other pretenders
Prince Soe Win (1947–present) (eldest son of Prince Taw Phaya Gyi, Prince Taw Phaya's older brother)

See also

 Burmese monarchs' family tree
 List of Burmese leaders
 List of Burmese consorts
 List of early and legendary monarchs of Burma
 List of Arakanese monarchs
 List of Shan States rulers
 List of rulers of Prome
 List of rulers of Toungoo
 List of heirs to the Burmese thrones

Notes

References

Bibliography
 
 
 
 
 
 
 
 
  
 
 
 
 
 
 
 

 
Burmese